Luo Senwen (born 16 January 1993) is a Chinese football player who currently plays as a midfielder for Wuhan Three Towns in the Chinese Super League.

Club career
After playing in the youth squad of Shandong Luneng Taishan, Luo started his professional football career in 2011. He played for Shandong Youth (Shandong Luneng youth team) in the China League Two and scored 2 goals in 13 appearances in the season. On 13 August, he scored his first league goal in a 4–0 home victory against Qingdao QUST. Luo was promoted to Shandong Luneng's first team squad by Henk ten Cate in 2012. He made his debut for Shandong on 1 August 2013 in a 2–0 home win against Guangzhou R&F, coming on as a substitute for Wang Yongpo in the 76th minute. Luo failed to establish with the club and was loaned to China League One side Chengdu Tiancheng for half season in July 2015.

On 14 February 2015, Luo was loaned to China League One side Hebei China Fortune for the 2015 season. He made a permanent transfer to Hebei China Fortune on 31 December 2015 after the club won promotion to the Chinese Super League. He would go on to play a vital part as the club were able to finish seventh and remain within the top tier. After several seasons within the club he would see his playing time diminish and on 29 July 2019 he was loaned out to another top-tier club and his personal hometown team of Chongqing Dangdai Lifan.

On 11 April 2021 he would be loaned out to second-tier club Wuhan Three Towns for the 2021 China League One campaign. The move would turn out to be a big successes and he would go on to establish himself as a vital member of the team and help aid the club to win the league title and gain promotion as the club entered the top tier for the first time in their history. The following campaign Wuhan would make the move permanent and he would be part of the squad that won the 2022 Chinese Super League title for the first time in the clubs history.

International career
Luo received his first called up for China U-20's squad by Su Maozhen in December 2010. He continued to play for U-20s in the 2011 Toulon Tournament and 2011 Weifang Cup. He made 2 appearances in the 2012 AFC U-19 Championship qualification as China U-20 qualified into the 2012 AFC U-19 Championship.

Career statistics 
Statistics accurate as of match played 31 January 2023.

Honours

Club
Wuhan Three Towns
Chinese Super League: 2022.
China League One: 2021.

References

External links
 

1993 births
Living people
Chinese footballers
Footballers from Chongqing
Shandong Taishan F.C. players
Chengdu Tiancheng F.C. players
Hebei F.C. players
Chongqing Liangjiang Athletic F.C. players
Chinese Super League players
China League One players
China League Two players
Association football midfielders